Jacques Tilouine is a professor of mathematics at Université Sorbonne Paris Nord working in number theory and automorphic forms, particularly Iwasawa theory.

Career
Tilouine received his PhD in mathematics from Paris-Sud University in 1989 under the supervision of John H. Coates. He is a professor of mathematics at Université Sorbonne Paris Nord.

Research
Tilouine has worked on the anticyclotomic main conjecture of Iwasawa theory, special values of L-functions, and Serre-type conjectures for symplectic groups.

Selected publications

References

External links
 

20th-century  French mathematicians
21st-century  French mathematicians
Number theorists
Living people
Date of birth missing (living people)
Place of birth missing (living people)
University of Paris alumni
Academic staff of the University of Paris
Year of birth missing (living people)